Waccasassa Bay Preserve State Park is a  salt marsh that stretches from Cedar Key and Yankee Town, and is only accessible by boat. It includes the part of Gulf Hammock wetlands area that is closest to the Gulf.

Some access points are from County Road 40 in Yankee Town, by boat down the Waccasassa River from the community of Gulf Hammock, and Cedar Key.

It is the home to numerous species of saltwater fish and shellfish, as well as many endangered and threatened species, including manatees, alligators, bald eagles and black bears. The bay is also the only known habitat for a highly endangered species of rodent, the Florida salt marsh vole (Microtus dukecampbelli).

Hours
Florida state parks are open between 8 a.m. and sundown every day of the year (including holidays).

References

External links
 Waccasassa Bay Preserve State Park at Florida State Parks
Absolutely Florida: Waccasassa Bay Preserve State Park 

State parks of Florida
Parks in Levy County, Florida
Swamps of Florida
National Natural Landmarks in Florida
Landforms of Levy County, Florida
1976 establishments in Florida
Protected areas established in 1976